The Long Hot Summer is an American drama series from 20th Century Fox Television that was broadcast on ABC-TV for one season from 1965–1966. It was aired in the UK on ITV.

Synopsis
The series was set in the Deep South community of Frenchman's Bend, Mississippi. The community  was dominated and owned by the town's wealthy, powerful (and deceitful) bank owner "Boss" Will Varner (Edmond O'Brien). A widower with two grown children who also owned other businesses besides the town's bank, the unscrupulous Varner ran the town and its citizens with an iron fist and nobody dared to question him. He and his family lived in the largest mansion in Frenchman's Bend.

However, problems arose in Varner's orderly world when Ben Quick (Roy Thinnes), a young man whose father Varner destroyed some years prior, returns to town after thirteen years away to reclaim his family's farm and to challenge Varner's absolute authority over the town and its people. Ben's aim was to settle the score against the wicked Varner in the fight his father ran from.

Supporting characters include Clara and Jody Varner. Jody was Will's weak-willed and immature but more honest son, and Clara was Will's sensitive and sensible but deeply troubled older daughter who was considered to be the lady of the house (in lieu of her late mother). To her father's dismay, she liked Ben. Other characters include the town's hotel owner Minnie Littlejohn who is a good friend to many in town and was also the mistress of Will Varner, and Eula Johnson, a 17-year-old girl who becomes a central point in wealthy Jody Varner's life after he picks her up during a rain storm and defends her from her brother and fiance. In the movie Eula was married to Jody Varner, but in the TV series she was merely a friend of Jody's.

Also seen occasionally was: Andrew, the Varner family's butler/chauffeur; Sheriff Harve Anders, the local sheriff for the county in which Frenchman's Bend is located; Judge Armistid, the community's judge; and Dr. Aaron Clark, the Varner family's physician.

Cast

Main
 Edmond O'Brien (1965 – January 1966) and Dan O'Herlihy (January 1966 – April 1966) as "Boss" Will Varner
 Roy Thinnes as Ben Quick
 Nancy Malone as Clara Varner
 Paul Geary as Jody Varner
 Ruth Roman as Minnie Littlejohn
 Lana Wood as Eula Johnson

Guest cast
 Paul Bryar as Sheriff Harve Anders
 Harold Gould as Bowman Chamberlain 
 Warren J. Kemmerling as Lucas Taney
 Charles Lampkin as Andrew 
 William Mims as Sam Ruddabaw
 Tisha Sterling as Susan Beauchamp
 Jason Wingreen as Dr. Aaron Clark

Production

Development
Created by Dean Riesner, The Long Hot Summer was based on the novel The Hamlet by William Faulkner, the short story "Barn Burning", and the 1958 film of the same name. The show retained the movie's theme song, "The Long, Hot Summer," written by Sammy Cahn and Alex North, and Jimmie
Rodgers sang it for the series just as he did for the film.

Broadcast
The Long Hot Summer was scheduled on Thursdays at 10 p.m. EST opposite CBS' Thursday Night Movie and NBC's long-running variety series The Dean Martin Show. The series was canceled after twenty-six episodes with the last original episode airing on April 13, 1966.

Casting
In January 1966, series star Edmond O'Brien left the series after a disagreement with the producers (the disagreement was about making Ben Quick the main focus of the show instead of the Varners) and was replaced by Dan O'Herlihy.  O'Herlihy played the role of Will Varner for the rest of the series' run.

Episodes

References

External links
  
 Long Hot Summer on TV IV 
 Long Hot Summer complete episodes on YouTube 

1965 American television series debuts
1966 American television series endings
American Broadcasting Company original programming
Black-and-white American television shows
Serial drama television series
Television series by 20th Century Fox Television
Live action television shows based on films
Television shows based on American novels
Television shows set in Mississippi
English-language television shows